Ben Cross (born 6 December 1978 in Wagga Wagga, New South Wales) is an Australian former professional rugby league footballer and is a specialist coach with the PNG Hunters in the Qld Cup. A New South Wales State of Origin representative , he previously played for Canberra Raiders, Melbourne Storm, Newcastle Knights, Leeds Rhinos, Wigan Warriors and Widnes Vikings.

Early life
Born at Wagga Wagga, New South Wales. Cross was educated at Batemans Bay High School.

Ben played his junior rugby league for Batemans Bay Tigers.

Playing career
Cross, also known as "The Boss", had an explosive start to his National Rugby League career with a suspension for striking following his début match in 2003. He moved to Melbourne Storm, and they reached the 2006 NRL Grand Final in which Cross was selected to play from the interchange bench in Melbourne's loss to Brisbane.  There was another citing for contrary conduct was made against him for an incident in the 2007 NRL Telstra Grand Final. The charge resulted in a two-week suspension.

A powerful ball-runner, Cross endeared himself to Melbourne Storm fans with his wholehearted efforts and aggression.  In the 2007 NRL season, Melbourne again reached the grand final where they defeated Manly-Warringah at Telstra Stadium.  This premiership was later stripped by the NRL for major and deliberate breaches of the salary cap.

In August, 2008, Cross was named in the preliminary 46-man Kangaroos squad for the 2008 Rugby League World Cup.

Late in 2010, Cross re-signed with Newcastle for 2011, however in October, 2010 Leeds offered Cross a two-year deal. Cross asked the Knights for a release and it was granted. Cross was then released by Leeds mid season by mutual consent. On 12 July 2011 he joined Wigan until the end of the season, and on the same day it was announced he would join Widnes for the 2012 season.

He scored his first ever professional try whilst playing for Widnes against Huddersfield in a victory 26-22 at Halton Stadium.

Coaching career
After the 2013 season, Cross returned to Newcastle, New South Wales to be an assistant coach to the Newcastle Knights' New South Wales Cup team.

On 11 March 2016, Cross was named the head coach of the New South Wales Rugby League Women's side. Andy Patmore replaced him in 2019.

After resigning as the head coach of the New South Wales Rugby League Women's side, Cross moved to Brisbane to be an assistant coach to the Brisbane Broncos' team. The Brisbane Broncos cut cross from their coaching staff in 2020.

On 13 October 2021, Cross was named the head coach of the Ipswich Jets' team.

References

External links
Widnes Vikings profile

1978 births
Living people
Australian rugby league players
Australian expatriate sportspeople in England
Canberra Raiders players
Country New South Wales Origin rugby league team players
Kurri Kurri Bulldogs players
Leeds Rhinos players
Melbourne Storm players
New South Wales Rugby League State of Origin players
Newcastle Knights players
Prime Minister's XIII players
Rugby league props
Rugby league players from Wagga Wagga
Widnes Vikings players
Wigan Warriors players